The Chickaloon Formation is a geologic formation in Alaska. It preserves fossils dating back to the Paleogene period.

See also 
 List of fossiliferous stratigraphic units in Alaska
 Paleontology in Alaska

Paleogene Alaska
Thanetian Stage